God Cries is the fourth album by Asphyx. It was released in 1996 by Century Media Records. Shortly after the release of the album, Theo Loomans was killed in a car accident, which was probably suicide.

Track listing

Personnel
Theo Loomans - vocals, bass guitar, guitars
Bob Bagchus - drums

References

Asphyx albums
1996 albums
Century Media Records albums